Peter Marshall  (born 26 October 1964) is a Scottish historian and academic, known for his work on the Reformation and its impact on the British Isles and Europe. He is Professor of History at the University of Warwick.

Biography
Marshall was born on 26 October 1964 in Orkney, Scotland. He was educated at Kirkwall Grammar School, before studying at University College, Oxford. His doctoral thesis was titled Attitudes of the English People to Priests and Priesthood, 1500–1553.

Marshall began his career as a teacher: he was a history teacher at Ampleforth College, a Roman Catholic private school in North Yorkshire. In 1994, he joined the University of Warwick as a lecturer. He was promoted to senior lecturer in 2001, and to reader in 2004. He was appointed Professor of History in 2006.

Honours
Marshall was the winner of the 2018 Wolfson History Prize for his book Heretics and Believers: A History of the English Reformation. In July 2018, he was elected a Fellow of the British Academy (FBA), the United Kingdom's national academy for the humanities and social sciences. He is also an elected Fellow of the Royal Historical Society (FRHistS).

Published works

Books authored

Books edited
 The Impact of the English Reformation, 1500–1640. London: Arnold. 1997. .
 The Place of the Dead: Death and Remembrance in Late Medieval and Early Modern Europe. With Gordon, Bruce. Cambridge, England: Cambridge University Press. 2000. .
 The Beginnings of English Protestantism. With Ryrie, Alec. Cambridge, England: Cambridge University Press. 2002. .
 Angels in the Early Modern World. With Walsham, Alexandra. Cambridge, England: Cambridge University Press. 2006. .
 Catholic Gentry in English Society: The Throckmortons of Coughton from Reformation to Emancipation. With Scott, Geoffrey. Farnham, England: Ashgate. .
 The Oxford Illustrated History of the Reformation. Oxford: Oxford University Press. 2015. .

References 

1964 births
Living people
20th-century Scottish historians
21st-century Scottish historians
Academics of the University of Warwick
Alumni of University College, Oxford
Fellows of the British Academy
Fellows of the Royal Historical Society
Historians of England
People from Orkney
Reformation historians
Scottish schoolteachers
Social historians